Live! is a live album by American composer, bandleader and keyboardist Carla Bley recorded at the Great American Music Hall in 1981 and released on the Watt/ECM label in 1982.

Reception
Critical reaction to the album is generally positive but varies. The Allmusic review by Brian Olewnick awarded the album 3 stars, stating: "Listeners looking for prime Carla Bley would do better to search out her earlier, far more adventurous and creative work". The Penguin Guide to Jazz awarded the album 3½ stars and stated: "Live! is a treat, representing one of the finest performances by her and Mantler on record".

Track listing
All compositions by Carla Bley.
 "Blunt Object" - 5:10  
 "The Lord Is Listenin' to Ya, Hallelujah!" - 7:24  
 "Time and Us" - 7:59  
 "Still in the Room" - 9:06  
 "Real Life Hits" - 4:26  
 "Song Sung Long" - 7:30

Personnel
Carla Bley - organ, glockenspiel, piano (track 3)
Michael Mantler - trumpet  
Steve Slagle - alto saxophone, soprano saxophone, flute  
Tony Dagradi - tenor saxophone
Vincent Chancey - French horn
Gary Valente - trombone
Earl McIntyre - tuba, bass trombone 
Arturo O'Farrill - piano, organ (track 3) 
Steve Swallow - bass guitar  
D. Sharpe - drums

References

ECM Records live albums
Carla Bley live albums
1981 live albums
Albums recorded at the Great American Music Hall